Prof. Nigel Savery is Professor of Molecular Biologist at the University of Bristol.

During his time researching and lecturing at the University of Bristol, Dr Savery has made significant contributions to the field of transcription and DNA-damage recognition and repair.

Understanding how proteins interact with DNA is an important first step to developing novel methods to study genetics. Dr Savery's group has recently made advances in the study of the E. coli protein MFD ( a transcription-repair coupling factor, a bacterial protein involved in repair of damaged DNA).

References

External links
Savery's web-site

Living people
Year of birth missing (living people)